Marasmius austrorotula is a species of fungus in the large agaric genus Marasmius. Found in Argentina, where it grows on the fallen leaves of South American mountain bamboos (Chusquea spp.), it was described as new to science in 1969 by mycologist Rolf Singer.

See also
List of Marasmius species

References

External links

austrorotula
Fungi described in 1969
Fungi of Argentina
Taxa named by Rolf Singer